The Embassy of the Republic of Zambia in Moscow is the diplomatic mission of the Republic of Zambia to the Russian Federation. The chancery is located at 52 Mira Prospect in the Meshchansky District of Moscow.

See also 
 Russia–Zambia relations
 Diplomatic missions in Russia

References 

Russia–Zambia relations
Zambia
Moscow
Cultural heritage monuments in Moscow